Agustín Gajate Vidriales (born 23 March 1958) is a Spanish retired footballer who played as a central defender.

Not a skilled player (he was nicknamed Zapatones (Big shoes)), he excelled in man-marking, and played for Real Sociedad's first team for 15 years.

Club career
Gajate was born in San Sebastián, Gipuzkoa. A Real Sociedad youth graduate, he played solely for the Basque club, making his first-team debut on 1 January 1978 away against Valencia CF (1–0 win, 90 minutes played); he appeared very rarely for the back-to-back La Liga champions – only four matches – as he his favoured position was occupied by another youth graduate, Alberto Górriz, but gradually carved a starting XI niche in place of veteran Inaxio Kortabarria, going on to form an effective centre-back partnership with Górriz.

After only missing a total of three games from 1986 to 1988 (adding five goals) as Real won the Copa del Rey in one season and finished league runners-up in the other, Gajate retired in June 1992, having appeared in 364 top-flight matches, 469 overall.

International career
Gajate played three times for the Spain under-21 team, also appearing at the 1980 Summer Olympics as the nation exited in the group stage after three draws.

Honours
Real Sociedad
La Liga: 1980–81, 1981–82
Copa del Rey: 1986–87
Supercopa de España: 1982

See also
List of one-club men in association football 
List of Real Sociedad players

References

External links

1958 births
Living people
Spanish footballers
Footballers from San Sebastián
Association football defenders
La Liga players
Tercera División players
Real Sociedad B footballers
Real Sociedad footballers
Spain under-21 international footballers
Spain under-23 international footballers
Spain amateur international footballers
Olympic footballers of Spain
Footballers at the 1980 Summer Olympics
Basque Country international footballers